Pugh is a surname. Pugh may also refer to:

 Pugh Island, Nunavut, Canada
 Mount Pugh, Washington, United States
 Pugh Shoal, South Georgia
 70446 Pugh, an asteroid
 Pugh House (disambiguation), various buildings on the National Register of Historic Places

See also
 Pugh matrix, a decision-making method